Bradley Creek is a stream in the U.S. state of Iowa. It is a tributary to North Branch Old Mans Creek.

Bradley Creek was named after Stephen and Mary Bradley, pioneer settlers.

References

Rivers of Iowa
Rivers of Johnson County, Iowa